https://commons.wikimedia.org/wiki/File:MRDOYLE1.jpg
Andrew Thomas Doyle (September 23, 1917 – July 22, 1989) was an American Thoroughbred racehorse trainer known for his success with young horses. He was reported as both "Tommy Doyle" and "A. T. Doyle."

A native of Dublin, Ireland, Tommy Doyle came from a family with a long history in the sport of horse racing. He emigrated to the United States in 1951 and made his way to California where he eventually owned a ranch in Bradbury on which he raised and trained horses.

Widely respected for his ability to work with young horses, two-year-old fillies trained by Tommy Doyle won the Junior Miss and Del Mar Debutante Stakes a combined thirteen times. Among his best-known horses, Doyle trained Typecast to the 1972 American Champion Older Female Horse title and in 1975 conditioned Avatar to wins in the Santa Anita Derby and the third leg of the U.S. Triple Crown, the Belmont Stakes.

Tommy Doyle died from Alzheimer's disease at age 71 in 1989.

References

1917 births
1989 deaths
Deaths from Alzheimer's disease
American horse trainers
Sportspeople from Dublin (city)
Sportspeople from Los Angeles County, California
Irish emigrants to the United States
People from Bradbury, California